KSNB-TV (channel 4) is a television station licensed to York, Nebraska, United States, serving southeastern and central Nebraska as an affiliate of NBC. It is owned by Gray Television alongside Lincoln-licensed CBS affiliate KOLN, channel 10 (and its semi-satellite KGIN, channel 11, in Grand Island) and low-power CW+ affiliate KCWH-LD (channel 18). KSNB-TV's transmitter is located near Beaver Crossing, Nebraska. Its news operations are primarily based at a studio located north of Hastings on US 281 that housed the area's former NBC affiliate, KHAS-TV (channel 5, now dual MyNetworkTV/MeTV affiliate and KSNB-TV satellite station, KNHL); with a secondary news bureau and sales office on West State Street in Grand Island. Master control and some internal operations are based at KOLN's facilities on North 40th Street in Lincoln. In addition to its own digital signal, KSNB-TV is simulcast in high definition on the second digital subchannel of KGIN.

KSNB is officially part of the Lincoln–Hastings–Kearney market, which spans 42 counties in Nebraska—almost two-thirds of the state's land—and four counties in Kansas. Until recently, the market had no basis in television reality and was only fully realized on the local DirecTV and Dish Network feeds. However, with the conversion of KSNB to NBC, the market now shares all major network affiliates except for ABC, as the western, central and northern parts of the market receive ABC from KHGI-TV (channel 13) while Lincoln and the eastern portion of the market receives ABC from KLKN (channel 8).

History

Early history
KSNB signed on the air on October 1, 1965, as KHTL-TV, licensed to Superior, and was part of the ABC-affiliated Nebraska Television Network (NTN, subsequently rebranded to NTV) alongside KHOL-TV (channel 13, now KHGI-TV) in Kearney, KHPL-TV (channel 6, now KWNB-TV) in Hayes Center and KHQL-TV (channel 8) in Albion (later joined by K13VO, now KHGI-CD, in North Platte). NTV Enterprises acquired the NTV stations from original owner Bi-States Company in 1974 for $1.9 million. On June 3, the new owners changed channel 4's call letters to KSNB-TV, as its signal reached parts of Kansas in addition to Nebraska.

Joseph Amaturo bought the NTV stations in 1979 in an $8.5 million deal funded by the sale of KQTV in St. Joseph, Missouri. KCNA was split off from NTV on November 1, 1983, to become an independent station under the call letters KBGT-TV; Amaturo Group sold KSNB-TV, KHGI-TV, and KWNB-TV to Gordon Broadcasting for $10 million in 1985; the sale separated the NTV stations from KBGT, which was separately sold a year later to Citadel Communications and became KCAN, a satellite of Sioux City, Iowa station KCAU-TV. Citadel later moved KCAN to Lincoln as a stand-alone station, KLKN.

Gordon Broadcasting planned to sell the NTV stations to Sterling Communications for $11 million in 1989. However, later that year, the stations were placed into receivership; initially overseen by former owner Joseph Amaturo, Joseph Girard was appointed successor receiver in 1991. Under Girard, who operated NTV through Girard Communications, KSNB-TV, KHGI-TV, and KWNB-TV were sold to Fant Broadcasting, owner of WNAL-TV in Gadsden, Alabama, for $2 million in 1993.

On April 1, 1994, Fant took over the operations of Hill Broadcasting Company's KTVG (channel 17), an upstart independent station in Grand Island in the process of joining Fox, under a local marketing agreement (LMA), making it a sister station to the NTV stations. Concurrently with KTVG's primary Fox affiliation, KSNB-TV, KHGI-TV, and KWNB-TV took on a secondary Fox affiliation to carry the network's NFL coverage. In July 1995, Fant announced a deal to sell KSNB, KHGI, and KWNB to Blackstar, LLC, a minority-controlled company in which nonvoting equity interests were held by Fox Television Stations and Silver King Communications, for $13 million; although the deal, which would have seen the NTV stations switch to a full-time Fox affiliation, was approved by the Federal Communications Commission (FCC) on December 15, 1995, Fant cited delays in FCC approval in walking away from the deal in May 1996.

Fox affiliation
In July 1996, Fant agreed to sell KSNB-TV, KHGI-TV, and KWNB-TV to Pappas Telecasting for $12.75 million. Pappas immediately assumed control of the NTV stations through a local marketing agreement that began on July 1, and that September broke KSNB off from NTV and made it a Fox affiliate as a satellite of KTVG; the two served as the Fox affiliate for the western portion of the sprawling market. KHGI and KWNB remained ABC affiliates. In 1997, Pappas sold its right to acquire KSNB to Colins Broadcasting Company for $10 (with Colins paying $333,333 to Fant), as channel 4's signal overlapped with Pappas' Omaha station, KPTM; Pappas also entered into an LMA with Colins to continue operating KSNB. The sales of KHGI and KWNB to Pappas and KSNB to Colins were approved by the FCC on February 17, 1999, and completed on May 24.

KSNB-TV and KTVG dropped a secondary affiliation with UPN in January 1998; however, the network's programming returned in late 2000, and would remain until KOLN and KGIN channel 11 launched a UPN-affiliated subchannel on September 1, 2005. The network shut down a year later in favor of The CW, which was picked up by KCWL-TV (channel 51), owned by the Omaha World-Herald and operated by Pappas. Also in 2000, KSNB and KTVG added a secondary affiliation with Pax, renamed i: Independent Television on July 1, 2005, and Ion Television on January 29, 2007. The Ion affiliation was later discontinued.

Prior to June 2009, the stations were identified on-air as "Nebraska Fox 4 & 17." KSNB and KTVG began broadcasting network programming in high-definition on January 1, 2009, prior to the broadcast of the Orange Bowl.

KSNB was hampered by opting to return to channel 4 after the June 12, 2009, transition date (its digital signal had broadcast on UHF channel 34 before then), as the issue of lower VHF frequencies not transmitting well in digital (along with KSNB being one of the few stations digitally on channel 4 in the country) meant the station's coverage area was less than what had been mapped, and the lack of viewers with VHF-optimized digital antennas further complicated the situation. This likely led Pappas to switch Lincoln's KCWL from The CW to Fox as KFXL-TV, in order to maintain Fox service to southern Nebraska in a way that KSNB could not. When KFXL became a Fox station, KTVG and KSNB became its satellites. All three stations became branded as "KFXL, Fox Nebraska."

Shutdown and transition
The time brokerage agreement between Pappas Telecasting and Colins Broadcasting expired on November 30, 2009. As a result, KSNB and its two translators were removed from the Fox Nebraska network and shut down on December 1 (a third Colins-owned translator, K17CI in Beatrice, Nebraska, had left the air on June 12, 2009). KTVG soon followed in April 2010, leaving KFXL as the market's sole Fox station.

In 2010, Colins put the dormant KSNB license up for sale, occasionally carrying 3ABN programming to preserve the license.

Sale to Gray Television and MyNetworkTV affiliation
On November 21, 2012, it was announced that Gray Television, the owners of KOLN/KGIN, would acquire KSNB for $1.25 million. The Lincoln–Hastings–Kearney market has only five full-power stations (KOLN/KGIN and KHGI/KWNB are both counted as single stations for ratings and regulatory purposes), not enough to legally permit a duopoly. Colins and Gray sought a "failed station" waiver to allow the acquisition to move forward. The station deal included Lincoln translators K18CD and KWAZ-LP. On February 15, 2013, the FCC granted the assignment of the license to Gray, with the sale officially completed on February 25.

KSNB aired programming from Antenna TV in the interim on channels 4.1 and 4.2 from the newly licensed facilities near York, as well as on its digital K18CD-D and analog KWAZ-LP translators in Lincoln. The affiliation agreement with Antenna TV was exclusively intended for the station's second digital subchannel, but was carried on the primary digital channel as well while the station ownership changed hands. On April 1, 2013, the station took the MyNetworkTV affiliation previously held by the second digital subchannels of both KOLN and KGIN under the moniker "10/11 Central Nebraska." It also resumed a general entertainment programming schedule and introduced increased local programming, including the expected addition of local high school sports coverage. The second digital subchannel eventually began to also carry the same programming as the main channel, replacing Antenna TV. On September 2, 2013, KSNB became an affiliate of MeTV; the network provides the majority of the station's schedule, with MyNetworkTV programming airing from 12:00 to 2:00 a.m. Tuesday through Saturday. Soon after KSNB returned to the air full-time, it was added to all cable systems on the Lincoln side of the market as part of the retransmission consent compensation for carrying KOLN.

NBC affiliation
On June 11, 2014, Hastings-based KHAS-TV (channel 5), the longtime NBC affiliate for the western part of the Lincoln market, announced on its website and Facebook page that it would leave the air at midnight on June 13. KHAS' owner, Hoak Media, had recently merged with Gray, and original plans called for it to be sold to Excalibur Broadcasting to satisfy duopoly rules. Gray would have operated the station under an LMA. However, increased FCC scrutiny of LMAs prompted Gray to shut down KHAS. On the day KHAS-TV shut down, its NBC affiliation, syndicated programming, and news department moved to KSNB and the second subchannels of KOLN and KGIN. KSNB's MyNetworkTV and MeTV programming moved to its second digital subcarrier, as well as a third digital channel on KOLN and KGIN, with all channels being broadcast in high definition. Over-the-air viewers actually benefited from the switch, as it gave NBC a full-market affiliate for the first time ever. For most of the broadcasting era, KMTV and WOWT in Omaha (a sister station to KSNB and KOLN/KGIN) had doubled as Lincoln's NBC affiliate as well.

With the change, Charter Spectrum's Lincoln system (and surrounding smaller systems near Lincoln) carries the 4.2 subchannel on the channels occupied by KSNB and the primary 4.1 channel on the channels formerly occupied by Omaha-based WOWT. WOWT was moved to a standard-definition digital tier channel position following KSNB's NBC affiliation and later dropped altogether. Lincoln-area cable systems historically have never carried KHAS, instead opting to carry WOWT. As of August 2014 other Lincoln-area cable systems including Zito Media have continued to carry WOWT as the default local NBC affiliate.

KSNB briefly retained KHAS-TV's former branding, "News 5." It rebranded to "NBC Nebraska" on October 1, 2014, and then to "Local 4" on October 25, 2017.

On May 21, 2018, Gray agreed to acquire KNHL from Legacy Broadcasting for $475,000; in filing for FCC approval of the purchase in September 2018, Gray proposed to operate the station as a satellite of KSNB. The FCC approved the sale on February 12, 2019, and the sale was finalized on March 1.

Changes to KSNB/KOLN
On August 4, 2020, Gray announced plans to move the KSNB transmitter from York to a reconstructed KOLN tower (which had collapsed in an ice storm in January 2020) near Beaver Crossing, about  closer to Lincoln. On August 23, 2021, the FCC granted KSNB's request to change its city of license from Superior to York, and move from VHF to UHF channel 24. In March 2022, the station began to broadcast from the Beaver Crossing site.

Newscasts
With the sale to Gray Television, KSNB began to air two half-hour daily newscasts produced by KOLN: an early evening broadcast at 5:30 p.m. on weeknights and a nightly prime time newscast at 9:00 p.m. Both newscasts, which debuted on April 1, 2013, are broadcast in high definition and originate from KOLN's studios on North 40th Street on the northeast side of Lincoln. With the move of KHAS-TV's programming to KSNB-TV's primary channel, the station inherited KHAS' separate news operation and newscasts; the second digital subchannel continued to air the two KOLN-produced newscasts, though the 5:30 and 9:00 newscasts have since been dropped.

Technical information

Subchannels
The station's digital signal is multiplexed:

Analog-to-digital conversion
KSNB-TV shut down its analog signal, over VHF channel 4, on June 12, 2009, the official date in which full-power television stations in the United States transitioned from analog to digital broadcasts under federal mandate. The station's digital signal relocated from its pre-transition UHF channel 34 to VHF channel 4.

Translators
KSNB-TV formerly repeated its programming on one translator station, K18CD-D, licensed to Lincoln. On October 20, 2017, the broadcast tower for the Lincoln translator collapsed, rendering the translator out of commission. It returned to the air September 26, 2018 as CW affiliate KCWH-LD.

See also
Channel 24 digital TV stations in the United States
Channel 4 virtual TV stations in the United States

References

External links

NBC network affiliates
MyNetworkTV affiliates
MeTV affiliates
Ion Television affiliates
Gray Television
Television channels and stations established in 1965
1965 establishments in Nebraska
SNB-TV